The Nankoweap Trail is an unmaintained hiking trail on the North Rim of the Grand Canyon National Park, located in the U.S. state of Arizona.
The Nankoweap trail descends 6,040 feet in 14 miles from the Saddle Mountain trailhead to Nankoweap Creek and on to the Colorado River. It is considered to be the hardest of the trails into the Canyon. Hikers have to carry and cache water as there is none in the 11 miles between the trailhead and Nankoweap Creek.

In June 1996, a Boy Scouts group ran out of water in the vicinity of this trail, although they were not following the actual trail, but an off-trail route on a nearby ridge. Although one member managed to reach the Colorado River, another ultimately died from heat exhaustion and dehydration. This was covered in season 2 of I Shouldn't be Alive.

See also

 List of trails in Grand Canyon National Park

References

Further reading
 John Annerino, 2006, Hiking the Grand Canyon.  Sierra Club Books, 3rd ed.,

External links
 Nankoweap Trail at HikeArizona
 Nankoweap Trail National Park Service factsheet.

Hiking trails in Grand Canyon National Park
Grand Canyon, North Rim